Navan Road Parkway (Irish: Ollpháirc Bhóthar na hUaimhe) is a railway station in Fingal, Ireland. It is owned and operated by Iarnród Éireann.

Location
The station is on the Dublin - Sligo railway line (see Rail transport in Ireland), located between Ashtown railway station and Castleknock railway station.

The station is adjacent to the Navan Road dual carriageway R147 road  between the roundabout at the junction of Castleknock Road and Ashtown Road and the roundabout at the junction of Auburn Avenue and New Dunsink Lane. Access to the station is via a grade-separated junction off the R147.

Design and services
Similar to both Dún Laoghaire railway station and Leixlip Louisa Bridge railway station, the station building is on the bridge that connects the two platforms. From here there are lifts and stairs down to each platform. It is an unmanned station.

The station is served by Western Commuter services. InterCity services do not call at the station, although one can interchange at either  or Dublin Connolly railway station.

History
It opened on 21 January 2008 as 'Phoenix Park' station but was renamed on 25 September 2011 to 'Navan Road Parkway'.

Renaming
The station was built by the developers of the Phoenix Park Racecourse Apartments on the site of the old Phoenix Park Racecourse.
The station is further from the Phoenix Park than Ashtown Station.

The confusion over the name led to Iarnród Éireann erecting posters in Dublin Connolly railway station stating "For the Phoenix Park, use Ashtown Station".

With the start of the new railway timetable on 25 September 2011, the station was renamed Navan Road Parkway.

See also
 List of railway stations in Ireland
 Rail transport in Ireland
 Dublin Suburban Rail

References

External links
Irish Rail Navan Road Parkway station Website

Iarnród Éireann stations in Fingal
Railway stations opened in 2008
Railway stations in Fingal
2008 establishments in Ireland
Railway stations in the Republic of Ireland opened in the 21st century